Anicet Yala (born 9 August 1976) is a Gabonese footballer. He played in 21 matches for the Gabon national football team from 1994 to 2001. He was also named in Gabon's squad for the 1996 African Cup of Nations tournament.

References

External links
 

1976 births
Living people
Gabonese footballers
Gabon international footballers
1996 African Cup of Nations players
Place of birth missing (living people)
Association footballers not categorized by position
21st-century Gabonese people